The 61st Regiment Illinois Volunteer Infantry was an infantry regiment that served in the Union Army during the American Civil War.

Service
The 61st Illinois Infantry was originally organized at Carrollton, Illinois and mustered into Federal service on February 5, 1862.

The regiment was mustered out at Nashville, Tennessee, on September 27, 1865.

Total strength and casualties
The regiment suffered 3 officers and 34 enlisted men who were killed in action or mortally wounded and 4 officers and 183 enlisted men who died of disease, for a total of 224 fatalities.

Commanders
Colonel Jacob Fry, March 26, 1862- May 14, 1863 (Resigned)
Colonel Simon P. Ohr, May 14, 1863- September 14, 1864 (died).
Colonel Daniel Grass, September 15, 1864- May 15, 1865 (Discharged).
Colonel Jerome B. Nulton, July 18, 1865- September 8, 1865 (Mustered Out).

See also
List of Illinois Civil War Units
Illinois in the American Civil War

Notes

References
The Civil War Archive
Free eBook: The Story of a Common Soldier of Army Life in the Civil War, Leander Stillwell, 5th Corporal Co. D 61st illinois

Units and formations of the Union Army from Illinois
1862 establishments in Illinois
Military units and formations established in 1862
Military units and formations disestablished in 1865